Anna Maria Alvim Buarque de Hollanda (born 12 August 1948) was the Minister of Culture of Brazil from 2011 to 2012.
She worked as a singer before, and is the sister of singer-songwriter Chico Buarque and daughter of sociologist Sérgio Buarque de Holanda.

References

1948 births
Living people
Ministers of Culture of Brazil
People from São Paulo

Brazilian Communist Party politicians
Women government ministers of Brazil